Khafre Enthroned is a funerary statue of the Pharaoh Khafre, who reigned during the Fourth Dynasty of ancient Egypt (c. 2570 BCE). It is now located in the Egyptian Museum in Cairo. The construction is made of anorthosite gneiss (related to diorite), a valuable, extremely hard, and dark stone brought 400 miles down the Nile River from royal quarries. This highlights Khafre's importance and power as a ruler. The statue was carved for the Pharaoh's valley temple near the Great Sphinx, a part of the necropolis (funerary city) used in funeral rituals. This Old Kingdom statue has an important function in Egyptian tombs as substitute abodes for the Pharaoh's ka—the life force that accompanied a person with a kind of other self. After death, the ka leaves the body into the afterlife, but still needs a place to rest: the statue.

This sculpture, depicted in-the-round (versus relief sculpture), shows Khafre seated, one of the basic formulaic types used during the Old Kingdom to show the human figure. Mummification played a huge role in the Egyptian culture, a 70-day process to ensure immortality for the pharaoh. Starting in the 3rd millennium BCE, if the pharaoh's mummy was damaged, a ka statue was created to "ensure immortality and permanence of the deceased's identity by providing a substitute dwelling place for the ka".

Khafre rigidly sits in his royal throne, gazing off into the distance. The pharaoh wears a linen nemes headdress, which cover most of his forehead and folds over his broad shoulders. This royal headdress depicts the uraeus, or cobra emblem, on the front along with the royal false beard attached at the end of his chiseled chin. Khafre wears a kilt covering his waist, revealing his idealized upper body and muscle definition. The Egyptian idealized portraiture is not meant to record individualized features, but instead proclaim the divine nature of Egyptian kingship. Two stylized lions' bodies form the throne Khafre sits on, creating a sturdy base. Lotus plants (symbolic of Upper Egypt) and papyrus plants (symbolic of Lower Egypt) grow between the legs of the throne, referring to the unification of Upper and Lower Egypt which ended the Egyptian Pre-Dynastic period. The god Horus, depicted as a falcon, protects the backside of Khafre's head with his wings, another reference to the united Egypt. Besides the striking view of the falcon (unseen from the front) resting behind Khafre's head, Khafre's feet are emplaced upon a flat platform, engraved with nine archery bows, representing the king's and kingdom's dominance over foreign/domestic enemy tribes, the nine bows.

The symmetrical pharaoh shows no movement or change, suppressing all motion and time to create an eternal stillness; his strong build and permanent stance demonstrate no notion of time—Khafre is timeless, and his power will exist even in the afterlife. The statue is based upon compactness and solidity with few projecting parts; Khafre's block-like body is attached to the throne to last for eternity, creating one single structure. His arms rest on his thighs, directly facing the viewer in a rigid, frontal pose. The bilaterally symmetric statue, symbolizing order and control in the pharaoh, is the same on either side of the vertical axis of the statue, only differing in Khafre's clenched right fist. The tight profile and block-like aspect represent Khafre as a permanent being and part of the stone to keep his ka safe. Khafre will always exist, on earth and in the afterlife. The pharaoh's sculpture can be described as absolutely frontal, utterly immobile, and perfectly calm: the characteristics of Egyptian block statue.

Creating Khafre Enthroned 

In order to create this sculpture in-the-round, the sculptor used the subtractive method.  He began with a cube-shaped stone block of diorite.  First, the sculptor drew the front, back, and two profile views of Khafre on the four vertical faces of the stone. After the sketched plans were made, the sculptor chiseled away the excess stone on all four sides until the plans came together, meeting at right angles. The last step was sculpting specific details of Khafre's body and face, carving the falcon god Horus, and other designs on the throne. The subtractive method allows the sculptor to create a block-like look for Khafre's ka statue, a standard for Egyptian sculpture during this time period. In addition to the subtractive method, abrasion, rubbing or grinding the surface was used to finish the product off. The diorite statue stands at a final height of five foot six.

Khafre Enthroned in context with the funeral procession 

Khafre's ka statue, which would have been located in the Valley temple of Khafre, was only one part of an extremely intricate system used in Egyptian funerary rituals. Located at the Pyramids of Gizeh, the necropolis included the Valley Temple of Khafre, a mortuary temple, the Great Sphinx, and a causeway leading to the pyramid of Khafre.

The Great Pyramids of Gizeh (Pyramids of Giza), located on the outskirts of present-day Cairo, are three enormous pyramids for three Egyptian pharaohs with multiple smaller ones, housing the mummies of the royal family and nobles. From largest to smallest, the pyramids of Khufu, Khafre, and Menkaure are the most famous and dedicated to each god, respectively. Khafre's pyramid and tomb were designed as an eternal home for his mummy, where the serdab (chamber room) in the Valley Temple was meant to keep his ka statue. Unlike previous pyramids, such as the Stepped Pyramid of Djoser designed by the first known architect Imhotep, the Great Pyramids of Gizeh were not based upon the mastaba structure, a rectangular structure. The new, smoothly inclined surface of the tomb derives from a rectangular base, which is aligned by the four cardinal directions of the compass. The four sides finish at a pointed tip, referring to the emblem of the sun Re (Ra), called the ben-ben. These symbolic pyramids allowed the pharaoh's spirit to ascend to the heavens using the rays of the sun.

The funeral procession carrying the pharaoh's mummy began east of the Nile River, where the sun is reborn every morning and where the Egyptian citizens live. Khafre's mummy would have crossed the Nile River, which was the ribbon of life separating the east from the west. The Nile was extremely important in Egyptian culture, for it provided fertility of the land and represented life for the people who used it. Because of its importance and symbol of life, it was used as part of the procession to bury the pharaoh. Khafre's body would then meet at the west side of the Nile, or the land of the dead. Every night, the sun sets and dies, which is why the western section of the city was dedicated to burying the dead. The horizontal axis of east to west was symbolic to the Egyptians, representing the cycle of life and eternalness of their leaders; every day the sun is born in the east and dies at night in the west, yet is again reborn in the east the next morning.  The rhythm of the horizontal axis used in the funeral procession parallels with eternalness of the pharaoh.

Once on the west bank of the Nile, Khafre's mummy would travel along the causeway, or pathway, passing by the Valley Temple of Khafre where the Khafre Enthroned statue would be located. Next along the causeway is the Great Sphinx, a creature with a Pharaoh head and cat body carved out of the living/natural rock of the area.  Many believe that the face of the sphinx is actually Khafre, further honoring the Pharaoh in the funeral procession. Continuing along the causeway, the mummy and procession enter the Mortuary Temple of Khafre adjoining the pharaoh's pyramid. This is where offerings were made to the deceased pharaoh and further ceremonies performed. Sealing the mummy in the tomb of Khafre's pyramid, where his body and ka would peacefully rest for eternity, completed the funeral ritual.

References 

Sculptures of ancient Egypt
Egyptian Museum
Khafre